Football in London refers to the sport of association football played in the capital of the United Kingdom.

Football in London may also refer to:
 NFL International Series#London Games, a series of American football games played in London by visiting NFL teams
 London Blitz (American football), an American football team based in London
 London Olympians, an American football team based in London
 London Warriors, an American football team based in London
 London Monarchs, a defunct American football team based in London